Anthony C. Zacchei is an American ophthalmologist, an author of numerous publications and a member of such academies as the American Academy of Ophthalmology, the American Medical Association and the Pennsylvania Medical Society.

Career
Zacchei graduated from the Jefferson Medical College with a magna cum laude and many awards and honours. After that, he received training at the Emory University of Atlanta, Georgia. Later, he joined the world-renowned Bascom Palmer Eye Institute in Miami and became Director of glaucoma and Director of Cataract Surgery at the Moore Eye Institute which was a part of the Mercy System and the Crozer-Keystone Health System. He is a founding surgeon of Kremer Eye Center in Philadelphia, Pennsylvania. He also received memberships as an honorable member of Alpha Omega Alpha and performed over 50,000 Lasik surgeries and highly successful cataract surgeries.

References

Living people
American ophthalmologists
Jefferson Medical College alumni
Year of birth missing (living people)